Hopewell (also, Hopewell Center) is a former unincorporated community in Hopewell Township, Seneca County, Ohio, United States. The U.S. Geographic Names Information System (GNIS) lists the location of Hopewell as Unknown.

Hopewell was platted in 1836.

Nearby locations

This cemetery is still visible on current aerial views.
This is the current location of the Hopewell Church of God.

References

Geography of Seneca County, Ohio
Ghost towns in Ohio